Vilmos Vázsonyi (born as Vilmos Weiszfeld; 1868–1926) was a Hungarian publicist and politician of Jewish heritage.

Vázsonyi was born at Sümeg. He was educated at Budapest, where his remarkable eloquence made him the leader of all student movements during his university career. After he had completed his studies, the most vital social questions found in him an earnest investigator. He aroused a national sentiment against dueling, his success being proved by the numerous anti-dueling clubs in Hungary. Later, he began a social and journalistic agitation on behalf of the official recognition of the Jewish religion, and kept the matter before the public until the law granting recognition was sanctioned in 1895.

In 1894, Vázsonyi founded the first democratic club in Budapest, and became a common councilor. In 1900, he established the political weekly "Új Század" ("The New Century") for the dissemination of democratic ideas throughout the country. At the same time, he organized democratic clubs in all the large Hungarian cities. In 1901, Vázsonyi was elected deputy for the sixth district of the capital, on a democratic platform, of which he was the only public representative in the Hungarian Parliament as of 1906. At the election of 26 January 1905 he defeated Hieronymi, minister of commerce, as a candidate for the deputy-ship from his district.

Vázsonyi died on 1 June 1926 from cardiac arrest, after injuries suffered in an assault by Ferenc Gyulai Molnár and the notorious anti-Semite Lászlo Vannay, described as "Ford's protege".

Writings
Besides numbers of articles in the daily press, Vázsonyi wrote the following works:
"Önkormányzat" (1890), on autonomy
"A Választási elv a Külföldi Közigazgatásban" (1891), on the principle of election in foreign governments
"A Szavazás Deczentralizácziója" (1892), on decentralization in voting
"A Királyi Placetum a Magyar Alkotmányban" (1893), on the royal veto in the Hungarian constitution

References

1868 births
1926 deaths
People from Sümeg
Jewish Hungarian politicians
Justice ministers of Hungary
Hungarian writers